Kyaukkhauk Pagoda is a Buddhist pagoda located in Thanlyin Township, in southern Yangon Region, Myanmar. It is a popular tourist destination and also pilgrimage site for Buddhists. It is believed that the pagoda was built on Hlaingpotkon Hill about 2000 years ago by King Sulathrima of Thaton. There are four stairways and the pagoda resembles a Mon-style stupa. A pagoda festival is held annually in February (the 1st waxing to full moon of the Burmese month of Tabodwe) of each year. During Cyclone Nargis, the pagoda, which was located on higher elevation, served as a storm shelter for local villagers.

References

External links

Buddhist pilgrimage sites in Myanmar
Pagodas in Myanmar
Buddhist temples in Yangon
Historic sites in Myanmar
Tourist attractions in Myanmar